Butam is a possibly extinct Papuan language spoken in East New Britain Province on the island of New Britain, Papua New Guinea. It is related to Taulil. Like the Taulil, the Butam people had originally migrated from New Ireland.

References

Extinct languages of Oceania
Languages of East New Britain Province
Taulil–Butam languages